"Kiss Me Back" is name of a 2009 Electronica/Dance single from American singer and songwriter Kim Sozzi. The track is featured on her 2009 album Just One Day and is the follow-up track to "Feel Your Love," which also went to number one on the Billboard Hot Dance Airplay Chart in 2008. The track is listed as "Cry Tonight" on the "Ultra 2010" compilation CD.

Track listing
Digital download
"Kiss Me Back (Cry Tonight)" (Radio Edit) – 2:57
"Kiss Me Back (Cry Tonight)" (Jeff Martens Remix) – 5:28

Chart positions
Hot Dance Airplay: #1

References

2009 singles
Kim Sozzi songs
2009 songs
Ultra Music singles